The Texas Oil Company in Cheyenne, Wyoming was built in 1915.  It was listed on the National Register of Historic Places in 2003.  The listing included two contributing buildings.

References

National Register of Historic Places in Laramie County, Wyoming
Early Commercial architecture in the United States
Buildings and structures completed in 1915